Far field is the radiative component of an object's electromagnetic field.

Far field or The Far Field may also refer to:

Far-field acoustic levitation, a method of acoustic levitation
Far-field pattern, the directional dependence of radio waves' strength
The Far Field (album), a 2017 album by Future Islands
The Far Field (poem), a 1964 poetry collection by Theodore Roethke, and its title poem

See also
Farfield, a boarding house at Gresham's School
Farfield Friends Meeting House in Yorkshire